"Get in the Ring" is the fifth song on the Guns N' Roses album Use Your Illusion II. Written by Axl Rose, Duff McKagan and Slash, it is a diss track directed at music critics. Mentioned by name are critics from Hit Parader (Andy Secher), Circus, Kerrang! (Mick Wall) and Spin (Bob Guccione, Jr.).

Background
The song was originally written by McKagan as "Why Do You Look at Me When You Hate Me?", which is its first line. In the interview that precipitated Mick Wall's mention in the song (see below), Rose said: "I've brought in an album. Duff brought in one song. It's called 'Why Do You Look At Me When You Hate Me?' and it's just bad-assed. And I wrote a bunch of words to that." The song was then going to be titled "Get in the Ring Motherfucker" but that was changed too.

At the time of the song's release, Mick Wall of Kerrang! was thought to have been mentioned because of his book Guns N' Roses: The Most Dangerous Band in the World, which was a no holds barred collection of interviews and stories about the band. Wall denies this, and claims the real reason was an interview he conducted in early 1990 for Kerrang! that included Rose's threat to harm Vince Neil of Mötley Crüe after an incident involving Neil's wife and Izzy Stradlin.

The song suggests that Bob Guccione, Jr.'s father (founder of Penthouse magazine) "gets more pussy" than Guccione Jr. The younger Guccione responded in a letter to Rose, saying he accepted the challenge to a fight and could use the promotion to help sell magazines.

"Get in the Ring" is notorious for its amount of swearing.

Recording 
The chants of "Guns. And. Roses" and "Get in the ring" were recorded with the audience at a Saratoga Springs concert on June 10, 1991.

Personnel 
 W. Axl Rose – lead vocals, production
 Slash – lead guitar, production
 Izzy Stradlin – rhythm guitar, production
 Duff McKagan – bass, backing vocals, production
 Matt Sorum – drums, production
 Dizzy Reed – piano, production

References 

Guns N' Roses songs
1991 songs
Songs written by Axl Rose
Songs written by Duff McKagan
Songs written by Slash (musician)